Oak Bay-Gordon Head is a provincial electoral district for the Legislative Assembly of British Columbia, Canada.

Demographics

Geography 
After restructuring prior to the 2017 election, Oak Bay-Gordon Head consists of the entirety of Oak Bay, as well as portions of Saanich and Victoria.  The Saanich portions of the electoral district include Gordon Head, Cadboro Bay, and the Panhandle east of Shelbourne Street.  The Victoria portions are made up of the Jubilee and Gonzales neighbourhoods east of Richmond Road.  The University of Victoria, Camosun College Lansdowne campus and the Jubliee Hospital are located within Oak Bay-Gordon Head.

History 

Voters have chosen people across the political spectrum with NDP, Liberal and Green holding the seat in order from 1989.

Members of the Legislative Assembly 
The district has elected the following members to the Legislative Assembly:

Election results 

|-

|- bgcolor="white"
!align="left" colspan=3|Total valid votes
!align="right"|
!align="right"|
!align="right"|
|}

|-

|-
 
|NDP
|Charley Beresford
|align="right"|5,789
|align="right"|22.74%
|align="right"|
|align="right"|$30,917

|- bgcolor="white"
!align="right" colspan=3|Total Valid Votes
!align="right"|25,454
!align="right"|100.00%
!align="right"|
!align="right"|
|- bgcolor="white"
!align="right" colspan=3|Total Rejected Ballots
!align="right"|93
!align="right"|0.37%
!align="right"|
!align="right"|
|- bgcolor="white"
!align="right" colspan=3|Turnout
!align="right"|25,547
!align="right"|75.54%
!align="right"|
!align="right"|
|}

|-

|-
 
|NDP
|Elizabeth Cull
|align="right"|11,700
|align="right"|44.17%
|align="right"|
|align="right"|$45,690

|Independent
|John Ernest Currie
|align="right"|48
|align="right"|0.18%
|align="right"|
|align="right"|$244

|Natural Law
|Gary Zak
|align="right"|47
|align="right"|0.18%
|align="right"|
|align="right"|$165

|Independent
|Casey Edge
|align="right"|35
|align="right"|0.13%
|align="right"|
|align="right"|$604

|No Affiliation
|Nicholas Varzeliotis
|align="right"|35
|align="right"|0.13%
|align="right"|
|align="right"|$1,645
|- bgcolor="white"
!align="right" colspan=3|Total Valid Votes
!align="right"|26,487
!align="right"|100.00%
!align="right"|
!align="right"|
|- bgcolor="white"
!align="right" colspan=3|Total Rejected Ballots
!align="right"|123
!align="right"|0.46%
!align="right"|
!align="right"|
|- bgcolor="white"
!align="right" colspan=3|Turnout
!align="right"|26,610
!align="right"|79.49%
!align="right"|
!align="right"|
|}

|-
 
|NDP
|Elizabeth Cull
|align="right"|10,522
|align="right"|39.61%
|align="right"|
|align="right"|$42,729
|-

|-
|bgcolor="red"|    
|Human Race
|John Currie
|align="right"|42
|align="right"|0.16%
|align="right"|
|align="right"|$8
|- bgcolor="white"
!align="right" colspan=3|Total Valid Votes
!align="right"|26,566
!align="right"|100.00%
!align="right"|
!align="right"|
|- bgcolor="white"
!align="right" colspan=3|Total Rejected Ballots
!align="right"|422
!align="right"|1.56%
!align="right"|
!align="right"|
|- bgcolor="white"
!align="right" colspan=3|Turnout
!align="right"|26,988
!align="right"|83.16%
!align="right"|
!align="right"|
|}

|-
 
|NDP
|Elizabeth Cull
|align="right"|10,807
|align="right"|45.26%
|align="right"|
|align="right"|

|-
|bgcolor="red"|    
|Human Race Party
|Louis Lesosky
|align="right"|20 	
|align="right"|0.08%
|align="right"|
|align="right"|

|Independent
|Roland Isaacs
|align="right"|117 	
|align="right"|0.49%
|align="right"|
|align="right"|
|- bgcolor="white"
!align="right" colspan=3|Total Valid Votes
!align="right"|23,876
!align="right"|100.00%
!align="right"|
!align="right"|
|- bgcolor="white"
!align="right" colspan=3|Total Rejected Ballots
!align="right"|242
!align="right"|1.56%
!align="right"|
!align="right"|
|- bgcolor="white"
!align="right" colspan=3|Eligible Voters
!align="right"|32,351
!align="right"|
!align="right"|
!align="right"|
|- bgcolor="white"
!align="right" colspan=3|Turnout
!align="right"|
!align="right"|73.80%
!align="right"|
!align="right"|
|}

|-

 
|NDP
|Muriel Agnes Overgaard
|align="right"|9,580
|align="right"|35.91%
 
|Progressive Conservative
|Irvin Kimball Burbank
|align="right"|1,678
|align="right"|6.29%

|Independent
|Ernest A. LeCours
|align="right"|201
|align="right"|0.75%

|Independent
|Russel Ellsworth Downe
|align="right"|63
|align="right"|0.24% 
|- bgcolor="white"
!align="right" colspan=3|Total Valid Votes
!align="right"|26,680
!align="right"|100.00%
!align="right"|
!align="right"|
|- bgcolor="white"
!align="right" colspan=3|Total Rejected Ballots
!align="right"|237
|- bgcolor="white"
!align="right" colspan=3|Turnout
!align="right"|26,988
!align="right"|83.16%
|}

|-

 
|NDP
|Muriel Agnes Overgaard
|align="right"|6,741
|align="right"|26.17%
|align="right"|
|align="right"| 
 
|Progressive Conservative
|Victor Albert Stephens
|align="right"|6,284
|align="right"|24.40%
|align="right"|
|align="right"|
|- bgcolor="white"
!align="right" colspan=3|Total Valid Votes
!align="right"|24,755
!align="right"|100.00%
!align="right"|
!align="right"|
|- bgcolor="white"
!align="right" colspan=3|Total Rejected Ballots
!align="right"|497
!align="right"| 
!align="right"|
!align="right"|
|- bgcolor="white"
!align="right" colspan=3|Turnout
!align="right"| 
!align="right"| 
!align="right"|
!align="right"|
|}

External links 
BC Stats Profile - 2001 (pdf)
Results of 2001 election (pdf)
2001 83.16(pdf)
Results of 1996 election
1996 Expenditures (pdf)
Results of 1991 election
1991 Expenditures
Website of the Legislative Assembly of British Columbia

References

British Columbia provincial electoral districts on Vancouver Island
Politics of Victoria, British Columbia
Saanich, British Columbia